Bago, officially the City of Bago, is a 2nd class component city in the province of Negros Occidental, Philippines. According to the 2020 census, it has a population of 191,210 people.

It sets a land area of 389 square kilometres, which is 5% of the entire Negros Occidental and 10% of the total land area of component cities.

It is also tagged as the “Home of Historical and Natural Treasures”, owing to its contribution to the history of the province of Negros Occidental and country, and its scenery and flora and fauna making it an eco-tourism destination. It is also known as the “Boxing Capital of the Philippines” title, owing to the great names it produced in boxing. It is also home to the only three known populations of the endangered Irrawaddy dolphin in the entire Philippines. The other two populations are in Guimaras and Palawan. All of which are designated as critically endangered populations.

Etymology 
The community was named after a large tree called “bágo” (Gnetum gnemon) under which a native prince Mapagic died according to the writings of a Spanish historian, Diego de Povedano. Another version, however, noted that the name came from the shrub, bago-bago that grew abundantly in the riverbanks. Around the 17th and 18th Centuries, settlers from Molo, Iloilo formed a little village at the mouth of Bago River, presently a rich source of sand and gravel. The village grew into a large settlement prompting its elders to pass a petition for its conversion into a town or pueblo, which was granted in 1800.

History

Spanish Era 
Its history has its beginning on September 6, 1571, when the Spanish Adelantado, Miguel Lopez de Legaspi, allotted the community to a Spaniard named Juan Gutierrez Cortes as his "encomienda". At that time, the community was still composed of small clusters of settlements along the banks of a big river which later became known as the Bago River. The "encomiendero", since then, administered to the spiritual and socio-economic needs of the natives in the settlements until June 1578; however, a year before that, this community was placed under the evangelical visitations of Father Geronimo Marin, an Augustinian priest who had taken charge of the Christianization of the natives of Binalbagan since the year 1572. Father Marin, upon his arrival in the community, celebrated the feast of St. John the Baptist, who would later be accepted as the patron saint of the place. Following the traditions and practices of the Spanish missionaries and historians in recording the founding of a "pueblo" or town that usually coincides with the feast day of a saint and since the feast day of St. John the Baptist, falls on June 24 of each year, it follows thereof that Bago was founded on June 24, 1575. History only records 1575 as the year when Bago was founded so that the exact month and day can only be deduced from such traditional practices of the Spaniards. Manila, Cebu and Binalbagan also predicted the dates of their founding on the same historical situations; hence, the logical conclusion is that Bago was officially founded on the month, day and year heretofore mentioned.

As regards on how the town acquired its name, according to the manuscript of a Spanish historian, Diego Lope de Povedano, which is available in the library of the University of San Carlos, Cebu City, the town was named after a large tree called "Bago" under which, a prince by the name of Mapagic died.

Another historical version is that the place got its name from a shrub called "bago-bago" which was then growing luxuriantly along the river banks.

17th century 
From the year 1575 up to the close of the 16th century, no historical account was written about the community. Bago came into the historical scene again when, at early part of the 17th century, a group of settlers settled along the banks of Bago River. The arrival of these settlers merged into a sizable village capable of self- governance. In later years, the descendants of these settlers petitioned the Spanish authorities to declare their village a "pueblo" or town and to name it "Bago". Among the petitioners were Manuel Sitchon, Gregorio Varela, Paulino Torres, Jacinto Araneta, Clemente Celis, Mariano Gonzaga and Fernando Villanueva, whose forebears hailed from the town of Molo, lloilo. The said petition was finally granted by the Spanish authorities in the year 1800; thus, Bago officially attained the status of a "pueblo" or town in that same year.

19th century 

Between the years 1800 and 1898, the inhabitants of Bago are among those who suffered tremendously under the Spanish tyranny, injustice and oppression. This social condition finally led to a great revolt on November 5, 1898, when on this day, General Juan Anacleto Araneta rallied his people in the struggle for freedom. This historic event was chronicled in a historical marker found in the city public plaza of Bago which bears the following inscriptions:

Together with General Aniceto Lacson who led the forces in Talisay, he was able to force the capitulation of the Spanish garrison at Bacolod thus putting an end to the Spanish sovereignty in the province. Forthwith, a revolutionary government was established with General Juan A. Araneta as the Acting Governor. The Municipality of Bago, an election was held and Ramon del Castillo became the first elected municipal president who served in such capacity from the year 1898 up to the year 1900.

20th century 
In April 1901, the Americans came and established a civil government in the province of Negros Occidental which completely abolished the revolutionary government of General Araneta. Bago as one of the towns that were placed under the control of the Americans; however, they allowed the municipality to be governed by Filipino officials.

When the Japanese forces invaded the Philippines, the civil government of Bago was dissolved. The Japanese occupation forces tried to establish a provisional government but the local people refused to cooperate. When the joint American and Filipino forces including recognized guerrillas liberated the town on March 29, 1945, it was completely destroyed but rehabilitation work was immediately started.

Bago was finally granted its cityhood on February 19, 1966, by virtue of Republic Act. No. 4382 with Manuel Y. Torres as the hold-over City Mayor until 1998.

Legal limitations on the number of successive terms disqualified Mayor Manuel Y. Torres in running again as city mayor and in the 1998 local elections, his wife, Janet E. Torres run as candidate for mayor and won. Mayor Janet served Bago as city mayor for three consecutive terms.

Presently, the City of Bago is under the leadership of Mayor Nicholas Yulo.

21st century 
On July 27, 2018, the city of Bago was awarded at Gawad Kalasag 2018 City Disaster Risk Reduction and Management as 1st Placer under Component City Category.

Geography 
Bago has a total land area of 38,941 hectares, 3,651 ha. of which belongs to Mt. Kanla-on Natural Park. It is composed of 24 barangays, 16 of which are rural and 8 are urban. Based on NSO 2000 Census, urban barangays include Abuanan, Atipuluan, Caridad, Balingasag, Don Jorge Araneta, Ma-ao, Poblacion and Taloc. Barangay Ilijan, however, with a distance of 30.50 km from the city proper is the farthest barangay. Barangay Bacong has the biggest land area with 4,827.0350 hectares while Brgy Poblacion, as the smallest, has 311.5044 hectares. The city has 1,100 has-water area and 15 km coastline. Bago is traversed by the widest river in the province, the Bago River, which starts from the northeast slope of Kanlaon Volcano and drains into Guimaras Strait.

It has moderately sloping to rolling lands. Slopes are raging from 0 to 3% comprises 22.911.42 has. 3 to 8% comprises 5,783.92 has. 8 to 18% comprises 4, 682.22 has, 18.1 to 30% comprises 1,514.84 has, 30 to 50% steep hills and rolling comprises 1,735.18 has. and a very steep and mountainous 50% above comprises 2,313.57 has.

Normally, the city is wet from May to December and dry from January to April with a temperature level of 24.40 degrees Celsius. Average rainfall recorded is 5.68 mm for 89 rainy days within a year while average humidity level is at 76.17%.

Barangays 

Bago is politically subdivided into 24 barangays.

Climate

Demographics

99.6% of the residents speak Hiligaynon/Ilonggo while 0.4%  speak other languages such as Kinaray-a and Cebuano. When it comes to religion, 82% are Roman Catholic, 6% are Aglipayan, 3% are Iglesia ni Cristo, 2% are Convention of the Philippines Baptist Church, and the remaining are either Jehovah's Witnesses, Church of Jesus Christ of Latter Day Saints, Seventh Day Adventists, Evangelicals, etc.

Here are some notes regarding the city's demographic information:
 First recorded population was 23,630 in 1903
 2000 census showed that Bago has a population of 141,721
 Male Population is 72,777 (NSO 2000 Census)
 Female Population is 86,944
 Urban Population is 60,557 (NSO Census)
 Rural Population is 81,164 (NSO Census)
 Population Density is 362 persons per km2.
 Barangay Ma-ao has the biggest population of 14,916
 Barangay Bagroy has the lowest population of 1,305

Economy

Government

Ramón D. Torres was elected as Mayor of Bago in 2007, replacing Janet E. Torres, whose husband served as mayor for almost 40 years. The coliseum located in the heart of the city is named after him.

List of former chief executives
The following were the succeeding municipal presidents and mayors of Bago until the outbreak of the Second World War on December 7, 1941:

The leadership since World War II:

Notable personalities

 Araneta family - prominent Filipino clan who consider Bago as their primary hub.
 Juan Araneta - revolutionary National Hero
 J Amado Araneta - business tycoon
 Rafael M. Salas - United Nations Under-Secretary General, Executive Director UNFPA, National Hero
 Jesus Varela - Roman Catholic Bishop
 Jorge B. Vargas - Wartime Head of the Philippine Government, Executive Secretary to Manuel Quezon
 Mansueto Velasco, Jr. - Olympic Silver Medalist
 Roel Velasco - Olympic Bronze Medalist
 José Yulo - Speaker of the House, Wartime Chief Justice
 Arthur Villanueva - pro boxer
 Rogen Ladon – Medalist, Boxing

References

Sources

External links

 
 [ Philippine Standard Geographic Code]
 www.otopphilippines.gov.ph
 
 Local Governance Performance Management System

Cities in Negros Occidental
Populated places established in 1788
1788 establishments in the Philippines
Component cities in the Philippines